NGC 102 is a lenticular galaxy estimated to be about 330 million light-years away in the constellation of Cetus. It was discovered by Francis Leavenworth in 1886 and its apparent magnitude is 14.

References

External links
 

0102
Cetus (constellation)
Astronomical objects discovered in 1886
Lenticular galaxies